NA-132 (Sheikhupura-II-cum-Nankana Sahib) is a constituency for the National Assembly of Pakistan.

Area
Sharak Pur Tehsil, Sheikhupura District
Following areas of Ferozewala Tehsil, Sheikhupura District
Kot Abdul Malik
Abul Khair (excluding Galo and Kala)
Kot Pindi Das (excluding Khanpur, Mandiali and Chak No. 46)
Wandala Dial Shah
Faizpur Khurd
Following areas of Muridke Tehsil, Sheikhupura District
Chuhe Wali Kalan
Following areas of Nankana Sahib Tehsil, Nankana Sahib District
Jawahar Pur (excluding Mauza Madhodas)
Mirza Pur

Election 2002 

General elections were held on 10 Oct 2002. Mian Jalil Ahmad Sharaqpuri of PML-N won by 51,159 votes.

Election 2008 

General elections were held on 18 Feb 2008. Rana Tanveer Hussain of PML-N won by 48,193 votes.

Election 2013 

General elections were held on 11 May 2013. Rana Tanveer Hussain of PML-N won by 93,140 votes and became the  member of National Assembly.

References

External links 
 Election result's official website

NA-132
National Assembly Constituencies of Pakistan